Dúbravy (before 1927 Očovská Dúbrava, Ošowské Dubrawy) is a village and municipality in Detva District, in the Banská Bystrica Region of central Slovakia.

History
The village arose in the late 18th century, when it was separated from Očová.

Genealogical resources

The records for genealogical research are available at the state archive "Statny Archiv in Banska Bystrica, Slovakia"

 Roman Catholic church records (births/marriages/deaths): 1768-1895 (parish B)

See also
 List of municipalities and towns in Slovakia

External links
https://web.archive.org/web/20071217080336/http://www.statistics.sk/mosmis/eng/run.html
http://www.e-obce.sk/obec/dubravy/dubravy.html
Surnames of living people in Dubravy

Villages and municipalities in Detva District